The Fiat 124 Spider (Type 348), nicknamed the Fiata, is a front-engine, rear-drive, two-passenger roadster manufactured by Mazda for FCA, having debuted at the 2015 LA Auto Show for model year 2016.

Largely based on the fourth generation Mazda MX-5 Miata roadster, and manufactured alongside the MX-5 at Mazda's Hiroshima plant, the 124 shares its platform, mechanicals, interior and top mechanism with the MX-5 — it is distinguished by an FCA engineered and manufactured turbocharged Multiair engine, uniquely tuned shock absorbers, unique exterior styling and slightly increased length and cargo capacity over the MX-5.

The 124 nameplate and exterior styling details recall the Pininfarina-designed Fiat 124 Sport Spider, manufactured from 1966 to 1985.

Background
In May 2012, Mazda and Alfa Romeo — at the time a subsidiary of the Fiat Group, now Stellantis — announced a joint venture to manufacture a common rear wheel drive platform. The companies would "develop two differentiated, distinctly styled, iconic and brand specific, lightweight roadsters featuring rear wheel drive", with the two variants offering proprietary engines unique to each brand.

In December 2014, FCA's Sergio Marchionne determined Alfa Romeos would be manufactured only in Italy,
saying "some things belong to a place. Alfa belongs to Italy," adding "I remain committed to that architecture, with our powertrain. I'm not sure it will be with Alfa. But it will be with one of our brands."

At the time, Alfa Romeos were manufactured only in Italy, while Fiats were manufactured in Italy, but also globally — from Tychy, Poland, to Toluca, Mexico.

With their prior agreement in place — for FCA to market a roadster based on the MX-5 to be manufactured by Mazda at its Hiroshima factory — FCA conceived of marketing a Fiat badged variant in lieu of the Alfa Romeo variant. In August 2016, FCA formally announced the Fiat 124 Spider based on the Mazda ND platform.

In December 2016, the Detroit News said "in partnering with Mazda’s MX-5 Miata to resurrect the classic Fiat 124 Spider, Fiat Chrysler not only gained a halo sports car for its struggling Italian brand, but likely saved the most celebrated small sports car of the past 25 years (the MX-5)" — citing the markedly increased cost of developing a new car at the time and "the costliest wave of government regulation since the 1970s."

In January 2019, FCA announced the Fiat 124 Spider was to be withdrawn from the market in the United Kingdom with immediate effect. The Abarth 124 Spider continued to be sold, but this too was withdrawn from the UK market in April 2019.

On December 23, 2020, Stellantis announced the 124 Spider and 500 were to be withdrawn from their North American model lineup after the 2020 model year and would not return for 2021, as is the situation with 500L. These models were expected to sell into 2021 until stock depletion.

Specifications

The 124 manual transmission is from the third generation MX-5's six speed transmission to cope with the turbo's torque.

Multiair is a hydraulically actuated variable valve timing (VVT) engine technology  enabling "cylinder by cylinder, stroke by stroke" control of intake air directly via a gasoline engine's inlet valves. Developed by Fiat Powertrain Technologies, the technology bypasses a primary engine inefficiency: pumping losses caused by restriction of the intake passage by the throttle plate, used to regulate air feeding the cylinders.

Engines and performance
Note: MT6 = six speed manual transmission, AT6 = six speed automatic transmission.

Engines and performance, North American models
Note: MT6 = six speed manual transmission, AT6 = six speed automatic transmission.

Limited editions
At the 124's debut, Fiat marketed a 124 Spider Anniversary edition, with 124 units carrying the designation—to commemorate the 50th anniversary of original 124 Sport Spider. Including features of the 124 Spider Lusso Plus trim, the edition also includes chromed mirrors, red '124' badge on the front grille, interior numbered plaque, red exterior and black leather interior.

Abarth 124 Spider

The Abarth 124 Spider is a performance version of the Fiat 124 Spider (2016). It features an upgraded version of the 124's 1.4 litre MultiAir Turbo engine tuned to produce 170 PS (125 kW; 168 hp) at 5,500 rpm and 250 N⋅m (184 lb⋅ft) of torque at 2,500 rpm.

Reception
Jeremy Clarkson, in his "Driving" column of The Sunday Times, gave the Fiat 124 Spider three out of five stars, saying that "You'd expect the Fiat, being Italian and all, to be sportier and more manic than the MX-5, but actually it's quieter and less fun."

Sales 
 2016 :  (Europe) +  (United States) +  (Canada);
 2017 :  (Europe) +  (United States) +  (Canada);
 2018 :  (Europe) +  (United States) +  (Canada);
 2019 :  (Europe) +  (United States) +  (Canada);
 2020 :  (Europe) +  (United States) +  (Canada);
 2021 :  (United States) +  (Canada)

That is more than 36,500 units, and probably around 40,000 worldwide.

References

External links

  (USA)
 2017 Fiat 124 Spider First Drive Review: Incredibly Inevitable (Motor Trend)

124 Spider (2016)
Roadsters
Cars introduced in 2016
Rear-wheel-drive vehicles
Retro-style automobiles